Anna Konstantinovna "Nyuta" Federmesser is a Russian humanitarian worker, founder of the  and the Lighthouse Children’s Oncology Foundation, activist for the rights of oncology patients. She actively promotes awareness on the necessity of palliative care in Russia, suggesting legitimization of palliative help and establishment of proper education in this field.

Biography

Family and early years 

Nyuta was born in Moscow in a family of doctors. Her father Konstantin Federmesser (1930—2016) was one of the founders of obstetric anesthesiology in the USSR, while her mother Vera Millionshikova (1942—2010) was a pioneer of palliative care and creator of the first Russian hospice. In 1994 Nyuta graduated with honours from Moscow school No.1507, in 1995—1997 she studied English in Cambridge. As early as 17 years of age, Nyuta started as a volunteer in Russian and British hospices.

In 2000 she graduated from the English department of the Moscow State Linguistic University. In 2013 she graduated from the Public Healthcare department of First Moscow State Medical University. At the same time, in 2000—2013 she worked as an English teacher at Moscow school No. 57. Later she tried different occupations, from working in management of the Golden Mask theater festival to personal assistant of the Yukos Vice President and Head of Translation Department at the Chess Academy of Garry Kasparov.

‘Vera’ Foundation 

In 2006 Nyuta founded ‘Vera’ endowment fund, the first of its kind in Russia. The Fund was established to assist hospices and patients, provide palliative care, offer support to families with gravely ill children, raise awareness of oncology, advocate legal changes in order to secure rights of the cancer sufferers. The Fund motto said ‘If a person can’t be cured it doesn’t mean he can’t be helped’. In 2006, Russian Law on Health Protection didn’t cover palliative care.

She also co-founded the ‘Dom c Mayakom’ (‘A Lighthouse’) in-patient care facility for children with oncology, which was opened in Moscow On October 5, 2019. According to Federmesser, her mother Vera Millionshikova dreamed of creating that place for many years, but the initiative was blocked by bureaucracy for decades.

Public activities 
Anna is an activist in raising awareness on palliative care. She advocated for legislative changes in Russian Law and offered amendments that included hospices and palliative help into basic medical assistance. Federmesser is also a fighter for the rights of the oncology sufferers who are deprived of painkillers and prescription drugs to alleviate the pain. She also advocates for including education in palliative care into the curriculum of Russian medical universities: as of 2011, no medical school in the country had programs for a profession of a palliative care physician. She also suggests legitimization of volunteer help in hospitals.

References 

1977 births
Living people
People from Moscow
Russian activists against the 2022 Russian invasion of Ukraine
Russian humanitarians
Women humanitarians